Opacuincola dulcinella is a critically endangered species of freshwater snail endemic to New Zealand.

Habitat 
This snail has been found in two caves in very close proximity within a 1 km² area in Pōhara, near Tākaka. The population trend of this snail is unknown at present but it is regarded as potentially threatened by urban development and groundwater removal and contamination.

Conservation status 
In November 2018 the Department of Conservation classified Opacuincola dulcinella as Nationally Critical under the New Zealand Threat Classification System. The species was judged as meeting the criteria for Nationally Critical threat status as a result of it occupying a total area of less than 1 hectare. It is found in what is regarded as one location and is also classified as Data Poor under the threat classification system.

References

External links 
Image of the holotype specimen held at Museum of New Zealand Te Papa Tongarewa

Gastropods described in 2008
Endangered biota of New Zealand
Gastropods of New Zealand
Tateidae